Pavel Svoboda (born 9 April 1962) is a Czech politician and lawyer and from 2014 to 2019 a Member of the European Parliament (MEP) from the Czech Republic for European People's Party representing KDU-ČSL.

Early life and education
Svoboda was born in Prague and studied Law Faculty at Charles University. He also holds a D.E.A. degree from Université Sciences Sociales in Toulouse.

Career
From 2007 to 2009, Svoboda was an Ambassador of the Czech Republic to the Council of Europe.

From 23 January 2009 to 8 May 2009, Svoboda was minister without portfolio and chairman of the Government's Legislative Council. In 2009, he was on the Czech government’s shortlist for the role of European Commissioner.

In May 2014 Svoboda was elected Member of the European Parliament for KDU-ČSL, part of European Peoples Party. Subsequently he was elected Chairman of the European Parliament Committee on Legal Affairs (JURI). He is also a member of the European Parliament Intergroup on Integrity (Transparency, Anti-Corruption and Organized Crime)

References

External links
  Official biography

1962 births
Living people
Czech diplomats
Government ministers of the Czech Republic
MEPs for the Czech Republic 2014–2019
KDU-ČSL MEPs
Charles University alumni
University of Toulouse alumni
KDU-ČSL Government ministers
Politicians from Prague
20th-century Czech lawyers